Swift Reservoir is a reservoir on the Lewis River in the U.S. state of Washington. It is located in Skamania County. It was created in 1958 with the construction of Swift Dam.

See also
List of lakes in Washington (state)
List of dams in the Columbia River watershed

References 

Reservoirs in Washington (state)
Lakes of Skamania County, Washington
Protected areas of Skamania County, Washington
Gifford Pinchot National Forest

de:Swift-Talsperre